Stefan Petrucha (born January 27, 1959) is an American writer of comics and young adult fiction. He has written graphic novels in the X-Files and Nancy Drew series, as well as science fiction and horror. For 13 years, from 1994 to 2007, Petrucha wrote stories for Disney comic books published by Egmont.

Career
Stefan Petrucha has been a tech writer, an educational writer, a public relations writer and an editor for trade journals. He is also a teacher of comics, and teaches three online courses on writing for comics and other skills through the University of Massachusetts.

Selected bibliography
Making God (Between the Lines, 1997)
Dark Ages:  Assamite (White Wolf, 2002)
Haunting the Dead:  The Grass is Always Greener (White Wolf, 2003)
The Tunnel at the End of the Light in the Time Hunter series (Telos Publishing, 2004)
TimeTripper series
Yestermorrow (Penguin/Razorbill 2006)
InRage (Penguin/Razorbill 2006)
BlindSighted (Penguin/Razorbill 2006)
FutureImperfect (Penguin/Raozrbill 2007)
The Shadow of Frankenstein (Dark Horse Books 2006)
Wicked Dead series (HarperCollins 2007–2008)
Teen, Inc. (Walker Books for Young Readers, 2007)
The Rule of Won (Walker Books for Young Readers 2008)
Blood Prophecy (Grand Central Publishing, 2010)
Dead Mann Walking (Roc Books, 2011)
Ripper (Philomel, 2012)
Deadpool: Paws (Marvel, 2015)

Graphic novels/comic books
Squalor 4 issue limited series with Tom Sutton (First Comics, 1989–90)
Meta-4 on-going series with Ian Gibson, cancelled after 3 issues (First Comics, 1990–91)
Lance Barnes, Post Nuke Dick mini-series with Barry Crain (Epic Comics, 1993, collected edition Moonstone Comics, 2004)
Duckman (Topps, 1994)
X-Files (Topps Comics 1995-96) – also collected in trade paperbacks
The Bandy Man (Caliber Comics, 1996)
Kolchak:  The Devil in the Details (Moonstone Comics, 2002)
Mickey Mouse and Friends, Donald Duck and Friends, Walt Disney's Comics and Stories and other Disney comics (Gemstone Publishing, 2003–2008); stories originally written for Egmont Publishing 1994–2007
Nancy Drew, Girl Detective graphic novel series (Papercutz, 2005 onwards)
Beowulf graphic novel (HarperCollins, 2007)
Harvey Beaks (Papercutz)

Notes

External links

Stefan Petrucha at Fantastic Fiction

Wicked Dead series
Lance Barnes
Nancy Drew, Girl Detective

20th-century American novelists
21st-century American novelists
American male novelists
American comics writers
American children's writers
Novelists from New York (state)
Living people
1959 births
20th-century American male writers
21st-century American male writers
Disney comics writers